The Dow Partbooks (Christ Church, Mus. MSS 984–988) are a collection of five partbooks compiled by Robert Dow in Oxford around 1581–88. The collection includes mostly choral but also some instrumental pieces. At the end is an instrumental La gamba and a canon, both a 3 and apparently copied from Vincenzo Ruffo's book printed in Milan in 1564.

The partbooks are an important source for Tudor music, and the sole known source for some of the pieces. Robert Dow was a trained calligrapher and the books are unusually easy to read among manuscripts of the Tudor period. All works were copied by him, with the exception of numbers 53–4, which were copied by John Baldwin (a singing-man at St George's Chapel), and nos. 99–100, which were copied by an unidentified person. The numberings following no. 54 were added by several other people at a later time (19th century), in sequences that do not coincide perfectly.

The collection was acquired by Henry Aldrich and donated to Christ Church, Oxford as part of his bequest to the college following his death in 1710.

Contents

 N.B. pieces are numbered sequentially in the table above, rather than following the numbering of the MS, which contains some errors and is inconsistent between the partbooks.

References

Bibliography
 The Dow Partbooks, Oxford, Christ Church Mus. 984-988: facsimile with introduction by John Milsom (Oxford: DIAMM Publications, 2010)
 D. Mateer: Oxford, Christ Church Music MSS 984–8; an Index and Commentary, RMARC, no.20 (1986–7), 1–18

External links
 High quality, fully zoomable images of the Dow Partbooks are available at the Digital Image Archive of Medieval Music (DIAMM) (free registration required):
 GB-Och Mus. 984 (Discantus)
 GB-Och Mus. 985 (Medius)
 GB-Och Mus. 986 (Altus)
 GB-Och Mus. 987 (Tenor)
 GB-Och Mus. 988 (Bassus)
 

Music publications
Renaissance music manuscript sources
Books on English music